Karpenisi is a town in central Greece. It is the capital of the regional unit of Evrytania. Karpenisi is situated in the valley of the river Karpenisiotis (Καρπενησιώτης), a tributary of the Megdovas, in the southern part of the Pindus Mountains. Mount Tymfristos (2,315 m elevation) lies directly to the north of the town, and the foothills of mount Kaliakouda are in the south. Karpenisi has a ski resort and is a popular destination, especially during winter. It is called Switzerland of Greece for the resemblance with the mountainous country and its beauty, atypical for a Mediterranean place.

Etymology 
The name Karpenisi derives from the Aromanian word kárpinu (Carpinus betulus) + the ending -iş. The Greek spelling "Καρπενήσι" is influenced by folk etymology, the second combining form appearing to be "νησί" (island, pronounced [niˈsi]). The first mention of the name is traced back to an Ottoman tax ledger of 1454-1455.

Municipality

The municipality Karpenisi was formed at the 2011 local government reform by the merger of the following 6 former municipalities, that became municipal units:
Domnista (Ampliani, Domnista, Krikello, Mesokomi, Psiana, Roska, Stavloi)
Fourna (Fourna, Kleisto, Vracha)
Karpenisi (Agia Vlacherna, Agios Andreas, Agios Nikolaos, Fidakia, Kalesmeno, Karpenisi, Koryschades, Myriki, Papparousi, Pavlopoulo, Sella, Stefani, Stenoma, Voutyro)
Ktimenia (Agia Triada, Agios Charalampos, Chochlia, Domianoi, Petralona)
Potamia (Aniada, Chelidonas, Dermati, Karitsa, Klafsi, Megalo Chorio, Mikro Chorio, Mouzilo, Nostimo, Sygkrellos)
Prousos (Alestia, Aspropyrgos, Esochoria, Kastania, Katavothra, Prodromos, Prousos, Sarkini, Stavrochori, Tornos, Velota)

The municipality has an area of 948.570 km2, the municipal unit 250.887 km2.

Mayor of Karpenisi

 Kostas Bakoyannis, 1 January 2011 – 31 August 2014
 Nikos Souliotis, since 1 September 2014 (current)

History 
Karpenisi has a lot of history in the region. In antiquity, Karpenisi was known as Oechalia and ruled by king Evrytos, inventor of the bow.

During the Greek Revolution of 1821, the towns mountainous location was of strategic importance for central Roumeli. During more recent times, the region took part in WWI and WWII, becoming the place where the armed National Resistance was initiated.

Climate
Due to its altitude, Karpenisi has a temperate climate with abundant rainfall year round and much cooler temperatures. Snowfall is frequent and heavy in winter, whereas summers are pleasantly warm with cool nights.

Historical population

Sister cities 
  Asheville, US

Notable people 
Zacharias Papantoniou (1877–1940), writer
Ioannis Theodoropoulos, bronze medal in the pole vault 1896 Summer Olympics
Georgios Kondylis (1878–1936), General of the Greek army and Prime Minister of Greece 
Charalambos Katsimitros (1886–1962), General of the Greek army who distinguished himself during the Greco-Italian War
Pavlos Bakoyannis (1935–1989), Greek politician and journalist

Notable events 
Battle of Karpenisi (8 August 1823) during the Greek War of Independence

References

External links
GTP Travel Pages (Municipality) (in English and Greek)
 Tourist Guide of Karpenisi

Populated places in Evrytania
Municipalities of Central Greece
Greek prefectural capitals